PME  may refer to:

Electronics and computing

 Physical Medium Entity, an abstract defined by the IEEE 802.3 standard
 Power Management Event, both a signal sent by a PCI bus and in Wake-on-LAN standard.
 Protective Multiple Earthing, another name for the TN−C−S earthing system
 Particle mesh Ewald, an algorithm used in calculating electrostatic forces in molecular dynamics simulations in computational biology and physics

Education
 Professional Military Education, a term for systems for educating military personnel in the United States
 Professional Master of Education, a type of initial teacher education qualification in Ireland.

Other
 Progressive myoclonus epilepsies, a group of neurodegenerative diseases characterized by myoclonus (erratic muscle twitching)
 Public Market Equivalent, a measure of historical performance of private equity
 Pi Mu Epsilon, a U.S. national mathematics honor-society
 Pacific Mozart Ensemble, the old name of Pacific Edge Voices, a choir in California
 P.M.E., a clerical abbreviation for the members of the Roman Catholic Société des Missions-Étrangères du Québec